Jim Hawthorne (November 20, 1918 – November 6, 2007) was an American radio personality and comic actor. He was a disc jockey who was a pioneer of "free form" radio.

Hawthorne was born in Victor, Colorado, and began his career at a Denver radio station. He gained national attention for his broadcasts on Pasadena, California, station KXLA in 1947. While in Los Angeles, he also worked in early television and short films. He also issued his own records such as "Turn Your Head, Sweetheart".

Hawthorne moved to Hawaii in the late 1960s and developed the popular Checkers and Pogo children's show, which ran from 1967 to 1982 (long after he passed the role of "Checkers" to other actors).
In 1950, he created, produced and starred in the Saturday night coast-to-coast radio program, The Hawthorne Thing, which was the final network radio show to originate in NBC's Hollywood Radio City. "The Hawthorne Thing" also aired world wide on the American Forces radio network(AFRTS). At KLAC/Channel 13 in the early 1950s, he created the first late evening talk show on television, This Is Hawthorne. An article in the LA Times reflecting on early TV described the show as "predecessor of NBC's Saturday Night Live."

On KNBH/Channel 4, beginning in 1952, he did a daily five-minute weather show. In 1958, Jim traveled to KYA-San Francisco and created Voice Your Choice, which he brought to KDAY. In the early 1960s, while doing Instant Weather on KTTV/Channel 11, Hawthorne joined KFWB as assistant PD and morning DJ, and eventually became VP, National Program Manager for Crowell-Collier Broadcasting. While still at KFWB he joined Sherman Grinberg Productions as a writer, producer, narrator. He produced Jim Hawthorne's Funny World and Quicky Quiz television comedy shorts.

In 1965, "ol Weather Eyes" moved to Honolulu to "retire" and ended up creating the Checkers and Pogo kids show for TV which ran for 11 years. He was also involved with programming KGMB -Honolulu and was creative consultant to morning legend Aku. As one of his bits, since the TV weather was so short, he would hold up cards and do a pantomime. He was elected president of the newly formed Disc Jockey Association in 1960.

In 1970, Hawthorne moved back to his hometown, Denver, to help his ailing mother. He stayed for 11 years and established a very successful career at KOA, eventually becoming GM. In the late 1980s, Hawthorne returned to Southern California.

Hawthorne continued to entertain in semi-retirement. On November 6, 2007, he died of congestive heart disease at age 88 in Santa Barbara, California.

References

External links
 Link to Hawthorne aircheck
 

American radio DJs
American male film actors
American novelty song performers
American male television actors
Radio personalities from Denver
Radio personalities from Los Angeles
1918 births
2007 deaths
20th-century American musicians
20th-century American male actors